Herbert William Hollister Brown (14 December 1867 - ????) was an English cricketer from Bristol who played first-class cricket for Gloucestershire County Cricket Club between 1890 and 1894 in a career spanning sixteen matches. A bowler of unknown style and handedness, he took 36 wickets at a bowling average of 28.41.

References
Notes

Sources

1867 births
Date of death unknown
Cricketers from Bristol
English cricketers
Gloucestershire cricketers